Frank and Jesse (also known as Frank & Jesse) is a 1994 American biographical Western film written and directed by Robert Boris and starring Rob Lowe as Jesse James and Bill Paxton as Frank James. Based on the story of Jesse James, the film focuses more on myths of The James Brothers than the real history. It originally aired on HBO.

Synopsis 
Following the American Civil War, the two James brothers, along with the Younger brothers - Cole Younger (played by Randy Travis) and Bob Younger (Todd Field), Bob Ford (Jim Flowers) and Charles Ford (Alexis Arquette), Clell Miller (John Pyper-Ferguson), and Arch Clements (Nick Sadler), begin to feel oppressed by the Chicago railroad investors. They set off on a trail of bank robberies, train heists, and stage holdups while evading the dogged pursuit of Allan Pinkerton (William Atherton) and his detective agency.

Cast 
 Rob Lowe as Jesse James
 Bill Paxton as Frank James
 Randy Travis as Cole Younger
 Dana Wheeler-Nicholson as Annie
 Maria Pitillo as Zee
 Luke Askew as Lone Loner
 Sean Patrick Flanery as Zack Murphy
 Alexis Arquette as Charley Ford
 Todd Field as Bob Younger
 John Pyper-Ferguson as Clell Miller
 Nicholas Sadler as Arch Clements
 William Atherton as Allan Pinkerton
 Tom Chick as Detective Whitcher
 Mary Neff as Widow Miller
 Richard Maynard as John Sheets
 Jim Flowers as Bob Ford
 Mari Askew as Ma James
 William Michael Evans as Jesse Jr.
 Lyle Armstrong as McGuff
 Cole S. McKay as Sheriff Baylor
 Dennis Letts as Railroad C.E.O.
 John Stiritz as Ruben Samuels
 Micah Dyer as John Younger
 Jackie Stewart as Governor Crittendon
 Chad Linley as Archie Samuels
 Rhed Killing as Stage Driver
 Jerry Saunders as Northfield Teller
 D.C. 'Dash' Goff as Engineer
 Robert Moniot as Young Captain
 Norman Hawley as Baptist Preacher
 Jeffrey Paul Johnson as Davies Bank Teller
 Bryce Thomason as Reporter
 John Paxton as Working Man
 Elizabeth Hatcher-Travis as Woman on Train
 Sudie Henson as Old Woman on Train
 David Arquette (uncredited)
 Ron Licari as Townsman (uncredited)

Soundtrack 

The music score was composed by Mark McKenzie and released by Intrada Records.

"Frank and Jesse Suite"
"Main Title"
"Family Moments"
"Gentle Spirits"
"Tragedy At Home"
"Meet the James Gang"
"Marauding"
"Daring Escape"
"Frank's Despair"
"The Peace Ranch"
"Mountain Top Dance"
"The Lord is Callin' You"
"Northfield Battle"
"I Play Not Marches ..."
"Goodbye Jesse"
"Justice Will Be Served"

References

External links

1994 films
1990s biographical drama films
1990s heist films
1994 Western (genre) films
1990s action drama films
Action films based on actual events
American heist films
American Western (genre) films
Biographical films about Jesse James
Drama films based on actual events
1990s English-language films
Films about death
American films about revenge
Films directed by Robert Boris
Films set in the 1860s
Films set in the 1870s
Films shot in Arkansas
Trimark Pictures films
Cultural depictions of Allan Pinkerton
1994 drama films
Films produced by Elliott Kastner
1990s American films